Derner is a surname. Notable people with the surname include:

 Gordon Derner (1915–1983), American psychologist
 Lukáš Derner (born 1983), Czech ice hockey player

See also
 Berner
 Dener